MS Arrow is a  Ro-Ro ferry built by Astilleros de Huelva SA, Huelva, Spain in 1998 as Varbola for the Estonian Shipping Company, Tallinn. During a charter to Dart Line she was renamed Dart 6, reverting to Varbola when the charter ended. In 2005, she was sold to Malta and renamed RR Arrow. In 2007, she was sold to Seatruck Ferries, Heysham and renamed Arrow. In September 2022, it was revealed that she had been bought by Isle of Man Steam Packet Company for an estimated €9 million.

Description

She has a total of  lane capacity, which means she can carry 88 trailers, with provision for 12 passengers.

History
Varbola was built by Astilleros de Huelva, Huelva, Spain as yard number 571. She was built for Estonian Shipping Company, Tallinn. On 26 August 1998, she was chartered to Dart Line, Dartford for use on the Dartford–Vlissingen route. Varbola was renamed Dart 6 in January 1999. In September 1999, the charter ended and she reverted to Varbola. In October 1999, she was chartered to Merchant Ferries for use on the Heysham–Dublin route. In January 2003, Varbola was chartered to Dart Line for use on the Dartford–Vlissingen and Dartfort–Dunquerque routes. In May 2003, she was chartered to Norse Merchant Ferries for use on the Liverpool–Belfast route, transferring to the Heysham–Dublin route in April 2004.

On 18 July 2005, Varbola was sold to Elmira Shipping & Trading, Piraeus and renamed RR Arrow. She was reflagged to Malta. On 23 December 2005, she was chartered to Condor Ferries for use between Portsmouth, Jersey and Guernsey. The charter ended on 14 January 2006, following which she entered service with Norfolk Line. On 30 October 2007, she was sold to Seatruck Ferries for €15,000,000. The ship was renamed Arrow in November. Following further service with Norfolk Line she was laid up at Liverpool in May 2009. Arrow re-entered service with Seatruck on 20 October 2009 on the Heysham–Dublin route.

In May 2012 and 2013, Arrow was chartered to the Isle of Man Steam Packet Company for the Isle of Man TT. In October 2013, the Steam Packet Company confirmed a three-year charter which commenced on 28 April 2014 with a purchase option. During the summer of 2014, while not required in Steam Packet Company service, the vessel was temporarily sub-chartered to operate between Jersey (Channel Islands) and Portsmouth (England). She resumed services in the Irish Sea in the winter.

On 18 March 2016, Arrow was called in to cover freight services to the Channel Islands for Condor Ferries as the regular vessel, Commodore Clipper, was covering routes while  underwent repairs.

On 25 June 2020, while under subcharter to NorthLink Ferries, Arrow ran aground at the entrance to Aberdeen Harbour. She was freed by harbour tugs and continued to the quayside.

From 19 July 2021, she was chartered by Caledonian MacBrayne to carry freight on the busy Stornoway to Ullapool route, freeing  to make additional passenger crossings. On 23 July 2021, damage caused by a rope getting wrapped in the ship’s propeller resulted in the vessel being withdrawn from service. On 25 July 2021, she went to Belfast for repairs, arriving there on 27 July. Repairs were completed on 2 August and she returned to service from Stornoway on the evening of 3 August. The charter is due to end on 7 September. In December 2021, due to thick fog at Heysham causing several cancelled sailings for the Isle of Man Steam Packet in the week before Christmas, Arrow was brought in to help clear the backlog of freight, which allowed Ben-my-Chree to carry her full complement of passengers.

From 17 January to end of March 2023, Arrow was chartered by Caledonian MacBrayne to assist carrying freight on the busy Stornoway to Ullapool route during the closure of Uig port. She was used only four times (18 February, 8, 15 and 16 March) when  freight sailings were cancelled due to the weather conditions and to substitute her when there was significant traffic.

References

External links

 Current position of Arrow

1998 ships
Ships of Seatruck Ferries
Ships built in Spain
Ferries of Estonia
Merchant ships of Malta
Merchant ships of the Isle of Man
Maritime incidents in 2020